Mamoun Darkazanli (Arabic: مأمون داركازنلي (born August 4, 1958) in Aleppo, Syria) is a citizen of Germany and Syria who is wanted in Spain on terrorism charges.

He was arrested on October 15, 2004 in Hamburg on a Spanish warrant, but freed on July 18, 2005 after a ruling by the Federal Constitutional Court of Germany. Darkazanli is under sanction, as affiliate or supporter of al-Qaida, by the United Nations, by the European Union, and by the United States Treasury as a Specially Designated Global Terrorist. His company, called Mamoun Darkazanli Import-Export Company or Darkazanli Export-Import Sonderposten, in Hamburg, until recently was listed as well.

References

Living people
1958 births
Terrorism in Germany
Islamic terrorism in Spain
Al-Qaeda
German Islamists
Fugitives wanted on terrorism charges
Fugitives wanted by Spain
Muslim Brotherhood of Syria politicians
Syrian Islamists
Syrian emigrants to Germany